Nikolay Nikolayevich Kruglov (born 8 April 1981) is a former Russian biathlete. His father, Nikolay Kruglov, was also a biathlete. Kruglov Jr. has won a couple of medals with the Russian relay team. He is a two-time World Champion in the men's relay and a two-time World Champion in mixed relay. Also he won silver medals at the 2005 World Championships and the 2006 Olympics.

Kruglov retired from the sport after the 2009–10 season.

Biathlon results
All results are sourced from the International Biathlon Union.

Olympic Games
1 medal (1 silver)

World Championships
6 medals (4 gold, 1 silver, 1 bronze)

*During Olympic seasons competitions are only held for those events not included in the Olympic program.
**The mixed relay was added as an event in 2005.

Individual victories
3 victories (1 Sp, 2 Pu)

*Results are from UIPMB and IBU races which include the Biathlon World Cup, Biathlon World Championships and the Winter Olympic Games.

References

External links
 
 Official fan-club

1981 births
Living people
Sportspeople from Nizhny Novgorod
Russian male biathletes
Biathletes at the 2006 Winter Olympics
Biathletes at the 2010 Winter Olympics
Olympic biathletes of Russia
Medalists at the 2006 Winter Olympics
Olympic medalists in biathlon
Olympic silver medalists for Russia
Biathlon World Championships medalists